Susan Myra Kingsbury (October 18, 1870 – November 28, 1949) was an American professor of economics and a pioneer of social research.

Biography
Susan was born in San Pablo, California in 1870, the daughter of Willard Belmont Kingsbury, M.D., and Helen Shuler née DeLamater, and was raised in Stockton, California. Her father died when she was six, leaving Helen to raise Susan and her brother. Helen was dean of women at the College of the Pacific, where Susan would matriculate then graduate with honors in 1890. From 1892–1900 she was a history teacher at Lowell High School in San Francisco, while tending to her ailing mother. She graduated with an A.M. in sociology from Stanford University in 1899, Phi Beta Kappa.

Following the death of her mother, she moved to New York to study colonial economic history at Columbia University. In 1904, she taught history for a year at Vassar College. She graduated from Columbia with a Ph.D. in 1905, with a dissertation titled An Introduction to the Records of the Virginian Company of London. During her stay in London (1903–04), her readings inspired a personal interest in social reform. In 1906 she published the first of what would become a four volume set titled Records of the Virginian Company of London, with the final volume being completed in 1933.

Kingsbury became director of investigation for the Massachusetts Commission on Industrial and Technical Education for a year beginning in 1905. The next year she accepted a position as instructor in history and economics at Simmons University, becoming head of the department. She gained the rank of associate professor in 1907. The same year she was also named director of research for the Women's Educational and Industrial Union in Boston. She served as president of the New England History Teachers Association in 1911. From 1911–13, she directed a national study of the opportunities for women in social service.

Her various publications, including Labor Laws and Their Enforcement (1911) and Economic Efficiency of College Women (1911) caught the attention of Martha Carey Thomas, president of Bryn Mawr College. After listening to an address by Dr. Kingsbury in 1912, Thomas invited her to come to work at the College. In 1915 Dr. Kingsbury became director of the Carola Woerishoffer Graduate Department of Social Economy and Social Research at the college. This was the first graduate department in the country to train students for careers in social service.

In 1919, she helped found the American Association of Schools of Social Work in 1919, and served as vice president of the American Economic Association and the American Sociological Society. She and Thomas founded the Bryn Mawr Summer School for Women Workers in 1921. Susan was chairman of Pennsylvania's first minimum wage board and for nearly a decade served as chairman for the American Association of University Women Committee on Economic and Legislative Status on Women. During 1921–22 she toured China and India, then the Soviet Union in 1929–30, 1932, and 1936 to research conditions for women and children. She published her results of the Russia visits as co-author in 1935. She retired as professor emeritus of social economy at Bryn Mawr College in 1936.

Bibliography
Her published works include:

References

1870 births
1949 deaths
American sociologists
American women sociologists
Economic historians
People from San Pablo, California
University of the Pacific (United States) alumni
Stanford University alumni
Columbia University alumni
Vassar College faculty
Simmons University faculty
Bryn Mawr College faculty